Singapore participated in the 1951 Asian Games, which was held in the capital city of New Delhi, India from 4 March 1951 to 11 March 1951. This country is ranked 4th with 4 gold medals in this edition of the Asiad.

References

Nations at the 1951 Asian Games
1951
Asian Games